The Nazranians were a historical Ingush ethnoterritorial society that was formed during the 18th century when mountain Ingushes settled in the lowlands near the Nazran river.

History

Caucasian War 
Despite being under Russian rule and considered conquered, the Nazranians sometimes participated on the side of Caucasian Imamate, like the general uprising of Chechnya in March of 1840 or the uprising of Sunzha and Nadterechny Chechens, Karabulaks and Galashians in July of 1840.

See also 
 Galashians
 Khamkhins
 Fyappiy

References 

Ingush societies